Kandli is a village in Dharwad district of Karnataka, India.

Demographics 
As of the 2011 Census of India there were 95 households in Kandli and a total population of 449 consisting of 237 males and 212 females. There were 65 children ages 0-6.

References

Villages in Dharwad district